Nils Sæbø (8 May 1897 – 2 September 1985) was a Norwegian equestrian. He competed in the individual eventing at the 1936 Summer Olympics.

References

External links
 

1897 births
1985 deaths
Norwegian male equestrians
Olympic equestrians of Norway
Equestrians at the 1936 Summer Olympics
People from Radøy
Sportspeople from Vestland